Souls for Sables is a 1925 American silent drama film directed by James C. McKay and starring Claire Windsor. It was produced and released by Tiffany Pictures.

Plot
As described in a film magazine reviews, Fred Garlan is devoted to his wife Alice but has little time and not too much money to lavish on her. She seeks diversion outside her home and finds it in a crowd of fast people that includes Esther Hamilton and Harrison Morrill. Alice does not know the evil in Morrell or Esther's life of deception regarding her husband. She admires Esther's sable coat and expresses a desire to have one like it. Morrill contrives so that Alice obtains enough money through winning at poker and speculation to buy herself a sable coat. The husband is suspicious as he believes Morrill bought the coat and he and his wife separate. However, there is a reconciliation, after which Alice is satisfied with her home and life.

Cast

Preservation
A print of Souls for Sables is in the Library of Congress collection, BFI National Archive, and George Eastman House.

References

External links

Lobby cards and stills at Claire Windsor website

1925 films
American silent feature films
Tiffany Pictures films
American black-and-white films
Films directed by James C. McKay
1920s American films